Nellipaka is a village in East Godavari district of the Indian state of Andhra Pradesh. It is located in Nellipaka mandal of Etapaka revenue division. Nellipaka which also produces Red chillies with an output of approximately 25 tons of chillies per acre. Nellipaka is situated at the banks of River Godavari with population around 1600 people.

Nellipaka, East Godavari. 15 kms from Bhadrachalam Railway station.

Geography 

Transport 
Nellipaka is connected to Vijayawada by National Highway 221. It is situated 15km from Bhadrachalam road Railway station

References 

Villages in East Godavari district